Vladimir Viktorovich Predkin (born 31 May 1969) is a retired Russian swimmer, who won two gold and three silver medals in the 4×100 m freestyle relay at the 1996 Summer Olympics and the European and world championships of 1993–1995. Individually, he won two medals in the 50 m freestyle and 50 m butterfly events at the European Sprint Swimming Championships 1993.

Predkin graduated from the Lesgaft National State University of Physical Education in Saint Petersburg. He is married to Violetta Petruk, also a former competitive swimmer; they have a son. Predkin senior is still competing in the masters category.

References

1969 births
Living people
Swimmers at the 1996 Summer Olympics
Olympic swimmers of Russia
Olympic silver medalists for Russia
Swimmers from Saint Petersburg
Russian male freestyle swimmers
World Aquatics Championships medalists in swimming
Medalists at the FINA World Swimming Championships (25 m)
European Aquatics Championships medalists in swimming
Medalists at the 1996 Summer Olympics
Olympic silver medalists in swimming